The 1996–97 Belgian Cup was the 42nd season of the main knockout competition in Belgian association football, the Belgian Cup.

Final rounds
The final phase started in the round of 32 when all clubs from the first division entered the competition (18 clubs plus 14 clubs from the qualifications). All rounds were played in one leg except for the semifinals. For the first time, a replay was introduced for teams drawing in the quarter-finals only. The final game was played at the Heysel Stadium in Brussels and won by Germinal Ekeren against Anderlecht.

Bracket

* after extra time
+ after replay

References

Belgian Cup seasons
Cup